Carol Frost (born 1948) is an American poet. Frost has published several collections of poetry, and has held several teaching residencies. Frost is the founder and director of the Catskill Poetry Workshop at Hartwick College. Her work has featured in four Pushcart Prize anthologies.

Biography
Frost was born in Lowell, Massachusetts, and later graduated from the State University of Oneonta and Syracuse University after studying at the Sorbonne in Paris. Frost has received grants from the National Endowment for the Arts and is the winner of Pushcart Prizes. Frost's poetry has been praised for its "protean layers of observation" and her “encyclopedic approach to subject matter.”

Frost writes in intensive bursts of at least three weeks after spending not writing for several weeks or months. After her bursts of writing she likes to walk or go sailing. As a teacher Frost has been in residence at the Vermont Studio Center and taught at Washington University in St. Louis, Hartwick College and Wichita State University. Frost has also been a visiting poet at University of Wollongong in Australia.

Bibliography
Entwined: Three Lyric Sequences (2014)
Honeycomb: Poems (2010)
The Queen's Desertion (2006)
I Will Say Beauty (2003)
Love and Scorn: New and Selected Poems (2000)

References

External links
Frost's faculty page at New England College
Frost's poems at the Poetry Foundation

Living people
1948 births
Writers from Lowell, Massachusetts
American academics of English literature
American women poets
American literary critics
American women critics
20th-century American poets
21st-century American poets
20th-century American women writers
21st-century American women writers
American women non-fiction writers
20th-century American non-fiction writers
21st-century American non-fiction writers
Washington University in St. Louis faculty
Hartwick College faculty
Wichita State University faculty
Academic staff of the University of Wollongong